MD Helicopters, LLC. (formerly McDonnell Douglas Helicopter Systems) is an American aerospace manufacturer. It produces light utility helicopters for commercial and military use. The company was a subsidiary of Hughes Aircraft until 1984, when McDonnell Douglas acquired it and renamed it McDonnell Douglas Helicopter Systems. It later became MD Helicopters in the late 1990s when McDonnell Douglas merged with Boeing.

History

The company began in 1947 as a unit of Hughes Aircraft, then was part of the Hughes Tool Company after 1955. It became the helicopter division of Hughes' Summa Corporation in 1972, and was finally reformed as Hughes Helicopters, Inc. in 1981. However, throughout its history, the company was informally known as Hughes Helicopters.  The company was sold to McDonnell Douglas in 1984.

Hughes Helicopters produced three major designs during its 37-year history. The Model 269/300 was Hughes' first successful helicopter design. Built in 1956, and entering production in 1957, it would eventually become part of the Army inventory as a primary trainer, designated TH-55 Osage. In 1983, the company licensed Schweizer Aircraft to produce the Model 300C. Schweizer was eventually purchased by Sikorsky Aircraft, which is itself now a division of Lockheed Martin.

In May 1965, the company won the contract for a new observation helicopter for the U.S. Army, and produced the OH-6 Cayuse (Hughes Model 369). The OH-6 was later developed into the civilian Model 500, variants of which remain in production to this day.

In 1975, the company won the contract for the AH-64 Apache attack helicopter. By December 1981, six AH-64A prototypes had been built and the Army had awarded a production contract to the company. Production would reach more than 1,100 by 2005.

In January 1984, Hughes Helicopters, Inc. was sold to McDonnell Douglas by Summa Corporation. McDonnell Douglas paid $470 million for the company and made it a subsidiary with the name McDonnell Douglas Helicopter Systems in August 1984.  In 1986, McDonnell Douglas sold all the rights to the Model 300C to Schweizer Aircraft.

On August 1, 1997, McDonnell Douglas merged into Boeing, but Boeing's subsequent plans to sell the civilian helicopter line to Bell Helicopter in 1998 were thwarted by the US Federal Trade Commission (FTC).

In 1999, Boeing completed the spin off of the civilian line of helicopters to a newly formed MD Helicopter Holdings Inc., an indirect subsidiary of the Dutch company, RDM Holding Inc. The line included the MD 500 and variants as well as the family of derivative NOTAR aircraft that originated with Hughes Helicopters Inc. Boeing maintained the AH-64 line of helicopters and rights to the NOTAR system.

After suffering dismal commercial performance, the company was purchased in 2005 by Patriarch Partners, LLC, an investment fund. The company was recapitalized as an independent company, MD Helicopters, Inc. MD Helicopters is based in Mesa, Arizona.    Lynn Tilton, the Chief Executive Officer and sole principal of Patriarch Partners, was CEO of MD Helicopters until she relinquished control in March 2020 following bankruptcy court rulings related to Patriarch holdings.

By March 2022, the manufacturer filed for US Chapter 11 bankruptcy protection for restructuration, to be acquired by a creditor consortium led by Bardin Hill Investment Partners and MBIA Insurance, providing around $60 million of financing as debtors.

Products

(Under both McDonnell Douglas and MD Helicopters)
 MD 500
 MD 500 Defender
 MD 520
 MD 530
 MD 600
 MD Explorer

(Under McDonnell Douglas only)
 AH-64 Apache - Product line transferred to Boeing Defense, Space & Security in 1998
 MH-6 Little Bird - later under Boeing Rotorcraft Systems and now as Vertical Lift division of Boeing Defense, Space & Security

See also
 Hughes Helicopters
 NOTAR
Comparable major helicopter manufacturers:
 AgustaWestland
 Airbus Helicopters
 Bell Helicopter
 Boeing Rotorcraft Systems
 Russian Helicopters
 Sikorsky Aircraft

References

External links
 MD Helicopters official site

Helicopter manufacturers of the United States
Manufacturing companies based in Arizona
Companies that filed for Chapter 11 bankruptcy in 2022